The Genius of Jankowski! is a studio album released by Horst Jankowski in 1965 on Mercury LP record SR 60993 (stereo) and MG 20993 (mono).  The album was also issued, in truncated format, on a 7-inch "Little LP" mini-album for Seeburg jukeboxes.

Reception
Prior to appearing on its album charts, Billboard listed the album as a "Breakout" in May 1965.  The album was a commercial success, having been listed as high as #18 on the Billboard 200.

Track listing

References

1965 albums
Horst Jankowski albums
Mercury Records albums